Efrain Gabriel González Roa (born March 18, 1942 in Puerto Casado) is a retired Paraguayan football referee. He is known for having refereed in the 1986 FIFA World Cup in Mexico, when he sent off England's Ray Wilkins during a group game against Morocco: Wilkins having thrown the ball at him.

External links 
 Gabriel González at WorldFootball.net

1942 births
People from Alto Paraguay Department
FIFA World Cup referees
Paraguayan football referees
Living people
1986 FIFA World Cup referees
Copa América referees